Capriolo is a town and comune in the Italian province of Brescia, in Lombardy. It is situated on the left bank of the river Oglio, southwest of Lago d'Iseo.

References

External links

Cities and towns in Lombardy